Clearlake Riviera (formerly Clear Lake Riviera) is a census-designated place in Lake County, California. It lies at an elevation of 1755 feet (535 m). The population was 3,090 at the 2010 census.

Geography
According to the United States Census Bureau, the CDP has a total area of 5.2 square miles (13.5 km), over 99% of it land.

Demographics

At the 2010 census Clearlake Riviera had a population of 3,090. The racial makeup of Clearlake Riviera was 2,641 (85.5%) White, 36 (1.2%) African American, 75 (2.4%) Native American, 40 (1.3%) Asian, 5 (0.2%) Pacific Islander, 167 (5.4%) from other races, and 126 (4.1%) from two or more races. Hispanic or Latino of any race were 424 people (13.7%).

The whole population lived in households, no one lived in non-institutionalized group quarters and no one was institutionalized.

There were 1,224 households, 398 (32.5%) had children under the age of 18 living in them, 618 (50.5%) were opposite-sex married couples living together, 145 (11.8%) had a female householder with no husband present, 56 (4.6%) had a male householder with no wife present.  There were 132 (10.8%) unmarried opposite-sex partnerships, and 7 (0.6%) same-sex married couples or partnerships. 287 households (23.4%) were one person and 93 (7.6%) had someone living alone who was 65 or older. The average household size was 2.52.  There were 819 families (66.9% of households); the average family size was 2.98.

The age distribution was 749 people (24.2%) under the age of 18, 201 people (6.5%) aged 18 to 24, 777 people (25.1%) aged 25 to 44, 955 people (30.9%) aged 45 to 64, and 408 people (13.2%) who were 65 or older.  The median age was 40.3 years. For every 100 females, there were 96.2 males.  For every 100 females age 18 and over, there were 95.1 males.

There were 1,557 housing units at an average density of 298.0 per square mile, of the occupied units 878 (71.7%) were owner-occupied and 346 (28.3%) were rented. The homeowner vacancy rate was 5.3%; the rental vacancy rate was 9.4%.  2,116 people (68.5% of the population) lived in owner-occupied housing units and 974 people (31.5%) lived in rental housing units.

References

Census-designated places in Lake County, California
Census-designated places in California